Kodavalur or Kodavaluru is a village in Nellore district in the state of Andhra Pradesh in India The Maldevi River runs through Kodavalur.It is Located in Kovur (Assembly constituency). The present M. L. A. Of Kovur (Assembly constituency) is nallapareddy prasanna kumar reddy.

Geography
It has an average elevation of 8 meters (29 feet).

References 

Villages in Nellore district